Sustain is the fifth studio album from Buck-O-Nine and was released in the United States on August 7, 2007 on Asian Man Records and in Canada on September 6, 2007 by Stomp Records.

Track listing
I'm Not Dead
Cook Me Into The Bowl
Screamin' From the Suburbs
Less Than Comfortable
Knocking Down the Door
I Am One
Slow me Down
Lie to Me
Nothing Left to Lose
Sailing Away
Silence
Let's Drink

Credits

Performance
Jon Pebsworth - vocals
Jonas Kleiner - guitar
Dan Albert - trombone
Anthony Curry - trumpet
Craig Yarnold - tenor saxophone
Andy Platfoot - bass
Jeff Hawthorne - drums

Production
Produced by Buck-O-Nine
Recorded and engineered by Jeff Forrest at Doubletime Studios, San Diego, CA
Mixed and mastered by Jason Livermore at The Blasting Room, Fort Collins, CO
Artwork and design by Jonas Kleiner, Cover Photo by Andy Platfoot

References

2007 albums
Buck-O-Nine albums
Asian Man Records albums